WLLX (97.5 FM) is a Class C2 FM radio station serving the southern Tennessee area. The station was one of the first in the nation to own and operate a live, color weather radar system and distribute the images to its listeners via a subcarrier on the primary FM signal.

The station has had a successful history of serving the community in times of breaking news and severe weather conditions. WLLX was granted a construction permit by the Federal Communications Commission (FCC) in 2005 to upgrade its power from 25 kW to 50 kW. The project was completed and the station signed on the air in mid-January 2006 serving a population total near 3.5 million in the area south of Nashville, Tennessee to just north of Birmingham, Alabama.

The station is based in Lawrenceburg, Tennessee.

On August 5, 2008, WLLX split its simulcast with WWLX. The AM station re-launched with a new branding, "Classic Hits WLX" and a network of FM translators that cover Southern Middle Tennessee. In July 2014, Classic Hits WLX was re-launched as "105.3 The X" with a revised Classic Rock music format in addition to local sports coverage.

Both stations are owned and operated by Prospect Communications.

Television
WLLX launched Tennessee Valley Weather and purchased a dual polarimetric doppler weather radar following an EF-1 tornado that struck Lawrenceburg on February 5, 2020. Tennessee Valley Weather is a 24/7 weather channel carried on a host of digital platform and local cable provider affiliates. Content for the channel is produced from two television studios built at the radio station's Lawrenceburg broadcast center.

Translators
WLLX's programming is also carried on three broadcast translator stations to extend or improve the coverage area of the station.

References

External links
Official Website

LLX
Country radio stations in the United States
Radio stations established in 1992
1992 establishments in Tennessee